Line 1 of the Changchun Rail Transit is a rapid transit line running from north to south Changchun. It  opened on 30 June 2017. This line is 18.14 km long with 15 stations.

Opening timeline

Service routes
  —

Stations

References

Changchun Rail Transit lines
Railway lines opened in 2017
2017 establishments in China